Sealer may refer either to a person or ship engaged in seal hunting, or to a sealant; associated terms include:

Seal hunting
 Sealer Hill, South Shetland Islands, Antarctica
 Sealers' Oven, bread oven of mud and stone built by sealers around 1800 near Albany, Western Australia
 Sealers Passage, marine channel in the South Shetland Islands, Antarctica
 Sealers' War, conflict in southern New Zealand started by sealers in 1810

Sealant
 Concrete sealers, products applied to concrete to protect it from corrosion
 Heat sealer, machine using heat to seal products
 Stone sealer, surface treatment product to retard staining and corrosion in natural stone

See also
Seal (disambiguation)
Sealing (disambiguation)